Frederick IX of Brandenburg (22 March 1588 in Cölln – 19 May 1611 in Sonnenburg, Prussia (now Słońsk, Poland)) was a Margrave of Brandenburg.

Life 

Frederick, a member of the house of Hohenzollern, was a son of the Elector John George of Brandenburg (1525–1598) from his third marriage to Elisabeth (1563–1607), daughter of Prince Joachim Ernest of Anhalt.  Frederick was educated in Frankfurt and Tübingen and undertook an extensive Grand Tour through Europe.

In 1594, he was appointed Coadjutor and then, in 1610, elected Herrenmeister (literally, "Master of the Knights", equivalent to Grand Master) of the Order of Saint John, Bailiwick of Brandenburg, which was seated at Sonnenburg.  He died at the age of 23 and was buried in the parish church of Küstrin.

Footnotes

References and sources 
 F. A. W. Dünnemann: Stammbuch der brandenburgisch-preussischen Regenten, Nauck, 1831, p. 105 (Digitized)
 Samuel Buchholtz: Versuch einer Geschichte der Churmarck Brandenburg von der ersten Erscheinung der deutschen Sennonen an bis auf jezige Zeiten, vol 3–4, F. W. Birnstiel, 1767, p. 490

House of Hohenzollern
1588 births
1611 deaths
17th-century German people
Margraves of Brandenburg
Sons of monarchs